Universal dialectic is an ontological idea which is closely related to the Taoist and Neo-Confucian concept of taiji or "supreme ultimate."  In the West,  dialecticians including Hegel explored themes that some see as remarkably similar, laying the groundwork for unification. Universal dialectic is envisioned as a single fundamental creative principle of inherent complementarity, as inspired by  Heraclitus. However, rather than manifesting only cyclical change (as was the Greek view), it is progressive in nature, bringing about states of increasing complexity through a dialectical process of synthesis.

Accordingly, the term "universal dialectic" can be seen as part of an attempt to Westernize and/or modernize the concept of taiji in regard to the fundamental role and nature of complementary opposites in the ongoing self-organizing process of creation. It associates this traditionally Eastern view with the concept of dialectic advocated by Socrates, Hegel, and Marx. This Western influence adds a progressive element to the inexorable process of change, a concept which is absent in Oriental thought.
08:42, 5 October 2022 (UTC)

See also
Dialectical monism

Jean-Paul Sartre may also be considered to have developed his thought in this direction if one considers the framework that his biographers used, that of the three stages of liberty, equality and fraternity.  Sartre's writing was inherently dialectical but evolving towards the universal. See for a discussion of the historical development of dialectics.  See Lincoln, Charles The Dialectical Path of Law, 2021 Rowman & Littlefield.

Ontology